Ponkundu is a village in the Pattukkottai taluk of Thanjavur district, Tamil Nadu, India.

Demographics 

As per the 2001 census, Ponkundu had a total population of 708 with 331 males and 377 females. The sex ratio was 1139. The literacy rate was 74.92.

References 

 

Villages in Thanjavur district